Andrew John Callard (born  in Dartford) is a British male weightlifter.

Weightlifting career
Callard competed in the light-heavyweight and sub-heavyweight categories and represented Great Britain and England at international competitions. He participated at the 1992 Summer Olympics in the 82.5 kg event. He competed at world championships, most recently at the 1999 World Weightlifting Championships.

He represented England and won a bronze medal in the 82.5 kg light-heavyweight division, at the 1990 Commonwealth Games in Auckland, New Zealand. Four years later he won two silver medals in the 99 kg sub-heavyweight division, at the 1994 Commonwealth Games and two gold medals at the 1998 Commonwealth Games, the double medal count at each Games was courtesy of an unusual period when three medals were awarded in one category (clean and jerk, snatch and combined) which invariably led to the same athlete winning all three of the same colour medal.

Major results

References

External links
 

1968 births
Living people
British male weightlifters
Weightlifters at the 1992 Summer Olympics
Olympic weightlifters of Great Britain
Sportspeople from Dartford
English male weightlifters
Weightlifters at the 1998 Commonwealth Games
Commonwealth Games medallists in weightlifting
Commonwealth Games gold medallists for England
Commonwealth Games silver medallists for England
Commonwealth Games bronze medallists for England
Medallists at the 1998 Commonwealth Games